Guangzhou–Qingyuan intercity railway, also known as the Guangqing intercity railway, is a regional rail within Guangdong province, China. It will connect the provincial capital Guangzhou with Qingyuan. It is a part of the Pearl River Delta Metropolitan Region intercity railway system.

The second phase, from Huadu to Guangzhou station, is currently under construction.

History 
The railway was opened on November 30 2020.

Route
Starting at Guangzhou railway station, a high-speed railway will be built alongside the Beijing–Guangzhou railway within the city to Guangzhou North railway station. From there to Qingyuan railway station, this railway will run alongside the Wuhan–Guangzhou high-speed railway with separate platforms for each railway and three new regional stations being built in between these stations. After crossing the Bei River this railway will branch off to the west, serving two new stations in Qingyuan.

Stations

Notes

References

Pearl River Delta
Railway lines in China
Rail transport in Guangdong
Railway lines opened in 2020
25 kV AC railway electrification